is a 2000 Japanese short anime film. It won the Animation Film Award at the 55th Mainichi Film Awards.

Stand by Me Doraemon 2 is largely based on this Short Film.

Premise
Nobita finds his old teddy bear among the trash after his mother partially cleaned up their shed. He tells her not to throw it away. The stuffed animal was a precious gift from his beloved grandmother. Reminiscing about her makes, Nobita asks Doraemon to take him back to the time when he was three years old and his grandma was still alive.

Cast
Noriko Ohara - Nobita
Nobuyo Ōyama - Doraemon
Akiko Takamura - Nobita's grandmother
Michiko Nomura - Shizuka
Kaneta Kimotsuki - Suneo
Kazuya Tatekabe - Gian
Sachiko Chijimatsu - Tamako Nobi
Makiko Ohmoto - young Nobita
Rei Sakuma -  young Shizuka
Tomokazu Seki -  young Suneo
Kujira - young Gian

References

External links

2000s animated short films
2000 anime films
Grandmother's Recollections, A
Films directed by Ayumu Watanabe
Films set in Tokyo
2000s Japanese-language films
Films scored by Shunsuke Kikuchi
Anime short films